Mark Warman (born 5 August 1961) is a British conductor, musical director, composer, orchestrator, and educator. He has worked in London's West End on musical productions and orchestrated and conducted albums, TV and film scores.

Early life 
Warman was born in Kingston upon Thames and educated at Tiffin School before reading Music at King's College, Cambridge, where he sang in its Chapel Choir before becoming Musical Director in 1983 of the Footlights Revue.

Musical director 
At the age of just 23, Warman began his West End career as Musical Director of The Secret Diary of Adrian Mole Aged 13 3/4, which ran for 16 months at the Wyndham's Theatre. For EMI he conducted an orchestral version of the score by Ken Howard and Alan Blaikley at Abbey Road Studios.

This started a career where Mark has been the Musical Director, Conductor or Arranger for over 100 shows in the West End, as well as overseas.

Stephen Sondheim 
Over his career, Mark seems to have had a relationship with Stephen Sondheim. In 1998, Mark was the Musical Director on the first UK production of Sondheim's first musical, Saturday Night at the Bridewell Theatre in London. This was followed up in 2005 with Mark being the first Musical Director to work on Evening Primrose  for the 'Discover the Lost Musicals' series in London. Mark then worked on Into The Woods at the Donmar Warehouse in London, Sweeney Todd for Holland Park Opera Company in the UK and then Pacific Overtures at the Donmar Warehouse, which went on to win the 2004 Olivier for Outstanding Musical Production. Stephen Sondheim is often a guest at the Royal Academy of Music, where Mark currently continues to lead as its Principal Tutor. For the last 10 years Mark has been a judge for the Stephen Sondheim Society Student Prize of the Year competition, where himself, Julie McKenzie and a panel of judges select the best up and coming musical theatre graduate of the year.

Carl Davis - orchestrations
Mark has also had a long working career with American conductor and musician Carl Davis. Together, Mark has orchestrated several TV scores over the years including, the 1995 series of Pride and Prejudice starring Colin Firth, the 1995 documentary film Anne Frank Remembered starring Glenn Close and Kenneth Branagh, The Queen's Nose from 1995-2000, the 1995 series Oliver's Travels, The Thatcher Years, and A Dance To The Music Of Time.

Other film, TV and stage orchestrations

Film and TV 
Mark has worked on many scores over his career, orchestrating and writing for both film and television, mostly with the BBC. In 1986, Mark started working on the TV series of Mr Pye, followed shortly by A Penny For Your Dreams in 1987. Between 1987 and 1989, Mark worked on Foreign Bodies, another TV series on the BBC. In the 90's Mark worked on Mr. Abbott’s Broadway a BBC Omnibus production and the TV score of The Black And Blue Lamp.

Mark also worked on both the film scores of Vox Lux - a film by Brady Corbet, starring Natalie Portman and The Childhood Of A Leader - a film score with the music originally written by Mark's long-time friend Scott Walker.

Stage orchestrations 
Mark has also orchestrated many West End musicals over his career. Some of these include Nine at the Donmar Warehouse, Into The Woods at the Donmar Warehouse, Moll Flanders at the Lyric Theatre, Hammersmith, Hard Times at the Theatre Royal in Haymarket, Metropolis at the Piccadilly Theatre, London and The Secret Diary of Adrian Mole at the Wyndham's Theatre in London.

Mark has also composed and orchestrated many incidental music scores for the theatre including School For Scandal. Henry VIII and The Rivals for the Chichester Festival Theatre and Three Hours After Marriage for the Royal Shakespeare Company. in 2019, Mark composed the score for Alan Ayckbourn's new play The Boy Who Fell into A Book (Stephen Joseph Theatre)

Lost Musicals (1990 - 2013) 
Ian Marshall Fisher, Artistic Director of Lost Musicals, invited Warman to be Musical Director for his inaugural 1990 season of three musicals: Fanny, Allegro and Trouble In Tahiti. Warman went on to musically direct a further 15 shows in this project: Greenwillow (1991), DuBarry Was A Lady (1993), Music In The Air (1993), Red Hot And Blue (1994), Love Life (1995), Of Thee I Sing (1996), Gentlemen Prefer Blondes (1997), As Thousands Cheer (1998), I'd Rather Be Right (1999), Evening Primrose (2005), Nymph Errant (2006), Park Avenue (2008), Darling Of The Day (2010), Flahooley (2012) and Around The World (2013), which was presented in London and New York. A revival in 2001 of DuBarry Was A Lady with Warman conducting the BBC Concert Orchestra was broadcast on BBC Radio 3.

Scott Walker

Mark began working with the avant-garde musician Scott Walker on his album The Drift in 2003. Warman remained his musical director, conductor, keyboardist and orchestrator of albums, ballets and film scores until Walker's death in 2019. Brady Corbet's debut film The Childhood Of A Leader was chosen to close the 2017 International Film Festival Rotterdam with a live performance of Walker's score, performed by a 75-piece orchestra conducted by Warman.

Royal Academy of Music
In 2003 Mark was invited by Mary Hammond, then Head of Musical Theatre at the Royal Academy of Music, to create a one-year postgraduate course in Musical Direction which he continues to lead as its Principal Tutor. He was awarded an Hon ARAM in 2012.

Discography 
 The Secret Diary of Adrian Mole - 1984 Original London Cast - Orchestrator, Conductor
The Six Wives Of Henry VIII - 1988 Studio Cast
 Metropolis - 1989 Original London Cast - Music Director
 Children Of Eden - 1993 Original London Cast - Keyboards
 A Year In Provence - 1993 Original Soundtrack - Keyboards, Arranger
Moll Flanders - 1993 Original London Cast - Orchestrator, Producer
 Pride And Prejudice - 1995 Original Soundtrack - Orchestrator, Producer
Circle Of Life - 1996 The Kings Singers - Orchestrator
The Fields Of Ambrosia - 1996 Original London Cast - Conductor
 Beauty And The Beast - 1997 Original London Cast - Keyboards
 Saturday Night - 1998 Original London Cast - Vocal Arrangements, Music Supervisor
Hard Times - 2000 Original London Cast - Orchestrator, Producer
DuBarry was a Lady - 2001 Concert Cast - Music Director
 Here’s To The Ladies - 2002 Christine Andreas - Conductor
The Drift - 2006 Scott Walker - Orchestrator, Conductor
Voices Of The Valley - 2006 Fron Male Voice Choir / Czech Film Orchestra - Conductor
Charles Dickens' Hard Times -The Musical - 2008 Original London Cast - Recording Producer, Orchestrator
And Who Shall Go To The Ball? - 2007 Scott Walker - Orchestrator, Conductor
Chess In Concert - 2008 Concert Cast - Music Director
From the Valleys: The Best of the Welsh Choirs - 2008 - Conductor
Carl’s War - 2010 Czech National Symphony Orchestra - Orchestrator
Unburied Treasures: A Musical Revue - 2010 Original Cast - Producer
Carl Davis: Heroines in Music - 2011 Carl Davis - Orchestrator
Bish Bosch - 2012 Scott Walker - Orchestrator, Conductor 
Soused - 2014 Scott Walker - Orchestrator, Conductor
The Childhood Of A Leader - 2016 Original Soundtrack - Orchestrator, Conductor
Mary Poppins Returns - 2018 Original Soundtrack - Keyboards
Vox Lux - 2018 Original Soundtrack - Orchestrator, Conductor
Minus - 2018 Daniel Blumberg - Choir Director

Personal life 
Warman lives in London. He has just completed work on Mary Poppins Returns. He represents himself and still continues to record albums for shows, groups and solo artists.

References 

Living people
1961 births